Suprapubic aspiration is a procedure to take a urine sample. It involves putting a needle through the skin just above the pubic bone into the bladder. It is typically used as a method to collect urine in child less than 2 years of age who is not yet toilet trained in an effort to diagnose a urinary tract infection.

Indications 
In infants or young children with fever, laboratory analysis of the child's urine is needed to diagnose urinary tract infection. Children often are asymptomatic other than fever, or cannot describe the typical symptoms of pain or burning with urination. In children that cannot urinate on command, transurethral bladder catheterization is most often used. However, this method has high rates of sample contamination. Suprapubic aspiration has the lowest rates of contamination, but is often viewed as too invasive by practitioners and parents. In some children, urethral catheterization is not appropriate. In uncircumcised boys with tight phimosis or girls with labial adhesions, suprapubic aspiration is safe, fast, and likely to yield an uncontaminated urine specimen.

Since suprapubic aspiration is more invasive than transurethral catheterization, some medical professionals use suprapubic aspiration after a urine sample obtained with transurethral catheterization shows bacterial growth and there is concern for contamination.

Procedure 

Suprapubic aspiration is best performed if the child has not urinated recently, and thus has a full bladder. In infants, this can be ensured by checking that their diaper is dry. In all children, the bladder volume can be measured with ultrasound. In hospitals or clinics without access to ultrasound, the bladder can be palpated or percussed to verify location and estimate volume.

The area about 1-2 centimeters above the pubic symphysis is cleansed with antiseptic solution, such as betadine or alcohol. Local anesthesia of the planned puncture site can be given either as an infiltration of lidocaine (or similar), or application of topical anesthesia.

The patient is held still with gentle restraint. Since many children will be stimulated to urinate when the needle enters the bladder, the urethra is occluded, either by gently pitching the tip of the penis in boys, or with pressure on the urethral opening in girls. A thin needle (similar in gauge to one used for routine vein puncture) with a syringe is advanced until urine is withdrawn. Once adequate urine is collected, the needle is removed and any mild bleeding at the puncture site is stopped with gentle pressure.

The urine sample is then sent to the laboratory for urinalysis and urine culture.

Complications 

In children with full bladders verified by ultrasound, complications are rare. Small amounts of blood in the urine after the procedure is common and resolves quickly.

Large amounts of blood in the urine or infection of the abdominal wall puncture site are rare. Puncture of the bowel with the needle can occur if a loop of intestine overlays the bladder, but peritonitis is rare with such a small puncture. This can be avoided with use of ultrasound.

See also 
 Clinical Urine Tests
 Urinary catheterization
 Urinary tract infection

References

Surgical procedures and techniques